Stéphane Claireaux (born 23 June 1964) is a French politician. He has been Member of Parliament for Saint-Pierre-et-Miquelon's 1st constituency since 2014, and served until 2022. Formerly of the Radical Movement, he has been a member of the ruling La République En Marche! since 2017.

Assault 
During a protest against the COVID-19 vaccine pass in Saint-Pierre-et-Miquelon, demonstrators attacked the deputy by throwing seaweed, stones, and other projectiles at him while he was outside his home on his front porch. Claireaux stated that he was going to file a complaint. Emmanuel Macron denounced the "intolerable" and "unacceptable" aggression, and a number of elected officials recounted similar experiences.

References 

1964 births
Living people
Members of Parliament for Saint-Pierre-et-Miquelon
21st-century French politicians
Deputies of the 14th National Assembly of the French Fifth Republic
Deputies of the 15th National Assembly of the French Fifth Republic